Collision Drive is the second studio album by Alan Vega, released in 1981 by Celluloid Records.

Track listing

Personnel
Adapted from the Collision Drive liner notes.

Musicians
 Larry Chaplan – bass guitar
 Sesu Coleman – drums
 Mark Kuch – guitar
 Alan Vega – vocals, production

Production and additional personnel
 Donald Greenhaus – cover art
 David Lichtenstein – engineering
 Kenneth Torregrossa – assistant engineer

Release history

References

External links 
 

1981 albums
Alan Vega albums
Celluloid Records albums